A motor ship or motor vessel is a ship propelled by an internal combustion engine, usually a diesel engine. The names of motor ships are often prefixed with MS, M/S, MV or M/V.

Engines for motorships were developed during the 1890s, and by the early 20th century, motorships began to cross the waters.

History
The first diesel-powered motorships were launched in 1903: the Russian  (the first equipped with diesel-electric transmission) and French Petite-Pierre. There is disagreement over which of the two was the first.

See also

 Gas turbine ship (GTS) – prefix for a jet-engine/turbine-propelled ship
 Steamship (SS) – a steamship is a ship propelled by a steam engine or steam turbine. The name of steam ships are often prefixed with SS or S/S
 Royal Mail Ship (RMS) – Royal Mail Ship
 Ship prefix

References

External links

Ship types